Neoterebra pacei is a species of sea snail, a marine gastropod mollusk in the family Terebridae, the auger snails.

Description
Original description: "Shell elongated, with distinctly concave whorls; last whorl elongated, with rounded and tapered base; aperture elongated; whorls ornamented with 21-24 large, evenly-spaced axial ribs; subsutural band well-developed, projecting beyond outline of shell, producing concave appearance to whorls; axial ribs extend onto subsutural band, producing evenly-spaced, oval-shaped beads; axial ribs overlaid with numerous large, raised spiral threads; subsutural smooth, without threads; shell color pale lilac purple with scattered, large reddish-brown axial flames; base of shell darker purple; columella and siphonal canal brown; protoconch and early whorls dark purple-brown; interior of aperture white."

Distribution
Locus typicus: "Nixon's Harbour, South Bimini Island, 
Bimini Chain, Bahamas."

References

External links
 Fedosov, A. E.; Malcolm, G.; Terryn, Y.; Gorson, J.; Modica, M. V.; Holford, M.; Puillandre, N. (2020). Phylogenetic classification of the family Terebridae (Neogastropoda: Conoidea). Journal of Molluscan Studies

Terebridae
Gastropods described in 1987